Jalagam Vengal Rao or Jalagam Vengala Rao (May 1921 – 12 June 1999) was for much of his life a member of the Indian National Congress and was the Chief Minister of the Indian state of Andhra Pradesh which is now divided into two states, Telangana and Andhra Pradesh.

Early life
Rao hailed from Bayyannagudem in Khammam district (currently part of the Telangana state).

Career
His involvement in politics began when he was in his twenties, when he supported Congress in their campaign of armed defiance against the Nizam of Hyderabad. He was jailed for his involvement in this campaign, which was protesting the tenancy laws operating in the Telangana region. Although he tried and failed to be elected as an independent candidate in 1952, Rao subsequently was elected on four occasions to the Legislative Assembly of Andhra Pradesh, where he represented the Sathupalli constituency of Khammam district.

Lok Sabha
He was also twice elected to the Lok Sabha - the lower house of the Parliament of India - as a representative of the Khammam district constituency. The first of his successful Assembly elections was in 1962, and the period from 1952 to that time saw him occupying the post of president for the Khammam district branch of Congress and being the first chairman of the district council.

As Home Minister
In 1968, he became State Home Minister in the state government headed by Kasu Brahmananda Reddy. Later, during his period as Chief Minister of Andhra Pradesh, an office to which he was appointed by Indira Gandhi and held between 10 December 1973 and 6 March 1978, Rao's hallmark was his administrative efficiency. He is also known for his handling and containment of Naxalite insurgency, which took place during a revival of the Telangana movement that sought independent statehood. He almost wiped out Naxalism from the state through extra judicial killings namely encounters. Later, the Vimadalal commission was appointed to probe into attacks on Naxalites during his period in office and his earlier actions against Communist-inspired Naxalites during the 1960s have been referred to as a "reign of terror". The official website for the government of Andhra Pradesh refers to his tenure, which came about following a period of President's rule,  politically stable. Despite that popularity, he was unable to retain power in the 1978 elections.

Congress split
When Congress split during the mid-1970s, Rao initially did not join with the faction led by Indira Gandhi that was referred to as Congress (I). However, he did join in 1984 and with his election to the Lok Sabha in that year he served in the cabinet of Rajiv Gandhi, holding the post of Union Minister for Industry until 1989. For much of this period, between 1984 and 1988, he was also president of the state organization of his political party, being the Andhra Pradesh Congress Committee.

As Chief Minister
He was the 5th Chief Minister of Andhra Pradesh from 10 December 1973 – 6 March 1978. It was during his tenure as Chief Minister that three universities namely Kakatiya University, Acharya Nagarjuna University and Sri Krishnadevaraya University were started, catering for three regions of Andhra Pradesh: Telangana, Coastal Andhra, and Rayalaseema. Rao initiated a World Telugu Conference in Hyderabad in 1975.

Death
Jalagam Vengal Rao died on 12 June 1999.

Family
He has two sons, Jalagam Prasada Rao and Jalagam Venkat Rao. Jalagam Prasada Rao was a Member of the Legislative Assembly from Satthupalli constituency for two terms and he was a minister in N. Janardhan Reddy's cabinet. He held the portfolios of Small scale industries and Panchayat Raj.

Commemoration
Rao wrote an autobiography in the Telugu language, called Naa Jeevitha Katha. The contents caused some controversy with regard to the lives of other politicians. A part of it was published in English translation by Outlook magazine.

A park in Banjara Hills, Hyderabad was named after him as Jalagam Vengal Rao Park. There is also an upscale residential neighborhood named after him – Vengal Rao Nagar - and several educational institutions.

References

Further reading

Indian National Congress politicians from Andhra Pradesh
India MPs 1984–1989
India MPs 1989–1991
1999 deaths
Chief Ministers of Andhra Pradesh
1921 births
Lok Sabha members from Andhra Pradesh
Chief ministers from Indian National Congress
People from Khammam district
Commerce and Industry Ministers of India